Dual Survival is a cable television series that airs on the Discovery Channel.

Series overview

Episodes

Season 1 (2010)

Season 2 (2011)

Season 3 (2013)

Prior to the debut of Season 4, Discovery Channel aired a select episode titled "Dual Survival: Untamed" with bonus scenes not originally shown on the initial broadcast.

Season 4 (2014)

Season 5 (2015)

Season 6 (2015)

Note that "the rest" of season 6 is called season 7, with new survivalists.

Season 7 (2016)

Season 8 (2016)

Season 9 (2016)

References 

Lists of non-fiction television series episodes